Sara Bahmanyar (born 21 March 1999) is an Iranian karateka. She won one of the bronze medals in the women's kumite 50kg event at the 2018 World Karate Championships held in Madrid, Spain.

She represented Iran at the 2020 Summer Olympics in Tokyo, Japan in the women's kumite 55kg event.

She won one of the bronze medals in her event at the 2022 Asian Karate Championships held in Tashkent, Uzbekistan.

Achievements

References

External links 
 

Living people
1999 births
Iranian female karateka
Karateka at the 2020 Summer Olympics
Olympic karateka of Iran
Islamic Solidarity Games medalists in karate
Islamic Solidarity Games competitors for Iran
21st-century Iranian women